Giovanni Antonio Lecchi or Giannantonio Lecchi (Milan, 17 November 1702 - 24 July 1776) was an Italian Jesuit and mathematician. He lived and worked with success in Milan rising to a notable level of prominence.

Life 

Born in Milan, his family owned Villa Lecchi in Crescenzago. After completing his  studies at the Jesuit College of Brera in Milan, he joined the Society of Jesus in 1718, professing the vows in 1736.

At first professor of humanities in Pavia and Vercelli, Lecchi taught mathematics and hydraulics at the Brera College in Milan from 1738 to 1773. He was technical consultant to the Milan's Senate on hydraulic matters. His first work was published in Milan in 1739 and it was about the theory of light ("Theoria lucis, opticam, perspectivam, catoptricam, dioptricam").

In 1759, the Austrian Empress, Maria Theresa conferred upon him the title of imperial mathematician and hydraulic engineer, for which he received an annual pension of 300 florins. Later, Pope Clement XIII appointed him the director of hydraulic works, but he renounced the appointment with the advent of Pope Clement XIV.

He died in Milan in 1776.

Works

 Theoria lucis, opticam, perspectivam, catoptricam, dioptricam, Milan, 1739.
Avvertenze contrapposte alla Storia del probabilismo scritta dal padre Daniello Concina, e indirizzate ad un erudito cavaliere, Johann Eberhard Kalin, 1744.
 
 
Elementa geometriae theoricae, et practicae. Ad usum universitatis Braydensis, 2 vols., Milan, Giuseppe Marelli, 1753-1754.
 
 Piano della separazione, inalveazione e sfogo de' tre torrenti di Tradate, del Gardaluso e del Bozzente, Milan, 1762.
 
 Idrostatica esaminata ne' suoi principj e stabilita nelle sue regole della misura dell'acque corrente, Milan, G. Marelli, 1765.
 
 
 
 
 
  Repr. Giovanni Silvestri, 1824.

References

External links 
 

1702 births
1776 deaths
Italian mathematicians
18th-century Italian Jesuits
Scientists from Milan